This is a list of magazines writing about gadgets, consumer electronics and future technologies. The primary focus of the magazines in this list is or was writing about gadgets for at least part of their run.

Gadgets